Nobuteru Mori was a Japanese businessman and politician who founded Showa Denko, a leading Japanese chemical engineering firm, in the 1930s. He was also a member of the Japanese House of Representatives.

Mori was the father of Mutsuko Miki, an activist and former First Lady, and the father-in-law of former Japanese Prime Minister Takeo Miki.

References

Japanese businesspeople
Members of the House of Representatives (Japan)